The 1899 Paris–Roubaix was the fourth edition of the Paris–Roubaix, a classic one-day cycle race in France. The single day event was held on 2 April 1899 and stretched  from Paris to its end in a velodrome in Roubaix. The winner was Albert Champion from France.

Results

References

Paris–Roubaix
Paris–Roubaix
Paris–Roubaix
Paris–Roubaix